Jamshoro is a city in Pakistan.

Jamshoro may also refer to:

Jamshoro District, an administrative unit of Sindh, Pakistan
Jamshoro Power Station, a power station in Pakistan
Jamshoro railway station, a railway station in Pakistan

See also